Zamanabad (also Romanized as Zamānābād) is a village in Borj-e Akram Rural District, in the Central District of Fahraj County, Kerman Province, Iran. At the 2006 census, its population was 18, in 4 families.

References 

Populated places in Fahraj County